Suzano is a municipality in São Paulo state, Brazil. It is part of the Metropolitan Region of São Paulo. The population is 300,559 (2020 est.) in an area of 206.24 km². The elevation is 749 m.

Suzano has a large Japanese Brazilian population. It consists of a large downtown area surrounded by residential areas. There are three main roads that travel through the downtown section. One of them is a one-way street (northbound), and two are one-way streets (southbound). It was named after the engineer who built the train station.
	
The city features a medium-sized shopping mall, city hall, train station, frequent bus routes, and a small number of office and residential buildings.
Suzano is an important industrial center today, although it was originally agricultural.
	 	
Many soldiers who fought in Italy's Monte Castello in World War II were from Suzano.

History

On March 13, 2019, there was a school shooting at the Raul Brasil School in Suzano. Eight people were killed before the two gunmen died of suicide.

Law and government

Suzano's City Hall is located in the Baruel Street in the downtown of the city.

Mayors of Suzano
 1993–1996 – Paulo Tokuzumi (PSDB) 
 1997–2000 – Estevam Galvão (PFL) 
 2001–2004 – Estevam Galvão (PFL) 
 2005–2008 – Marcelo Cândido (PT) 
 2009–2012 – Marcelo Cândido (PT) 
 2013–2016 – Paulo Tokuzumi (PSDB)

Transportation

Railroads

Suzano has one train station that is part of CPTM line 11.

Roads
Suzano is crossed by three highways:

 SP-31 Índio Tibiriçá Highway
 SP-66 João Afonso Highway
 SP-70 Ayrton Senna Highway
 SP-88 Rodovia Mogi-Dutra Highway
 SP-21 Rodoanel Leste Gov. Mario Covas Highway

Sister cities
  Komatsu, Ishikawa, Japan

See also
Suzano school shooting

References

External links
 Suzano City Official website 

 
Populated places established in 1949